Leo McPartland (26 June 1920 – 29 July 1994) was an Australian rules footballer who played with Collingwood in the Victorian Football League (VFL).		

McPartland enlisted in the Royal Australian Air Force in August 1940, serving until the end of World War II. It was during this period of service that he played four senior games for Collingwood, scoring a goal in his final game against Hawthorn.

Notes

External links 

		
Profile on Collingwood Forever

			
1920 births
1994 deaths	
Australian rules footballers from Western Australia
Collingwood Football Club players
Claremont Football Club players